The 9000 Series is a series of heavy rail rolling stock that operates on lines 2, 4, 9 and 10 of the Barcelona Metro. Transports Metropolitans de Barcelona (TMB) awarded the contract for the construction of the 9000 series to Alstom in 2002. Constructed in Belgium, France and Spain, they are part of the Alstom Metropolis family of underground trains. Today, the 9000 series also operates in Latin America on the Santo Domingo Metro, Panama Metro, Lima Metro, and 18 three-car trains of this model on Line 3 of the Guadalajara light rail system.

Order and entry into service

TMB's contract with Alstom originally specified 50 driverless trains for line 9 only: in July 2005, however, TMB modified the contract to specify 34 semi-automatic trains for lines 2 and 4, and 16 driverless trains for line 9. In April 2009, TMB extended the contract to order 6 additional driverless trains for line 9.

24 trains entered service on Line 2 from 13 March 2008, cascading the 2100 Series to Line 4. 10 trains also entered service on Line 4 with the 2100 Series, replacing the remaining 1000 and 1100 Series trains. The remaining 16 trains entered service on Lines 9 and 10 when the first stages of the lines opened from 13 December 2009, with six more trains to follow when more sections of lines 9 and 10 open.

Design

In Barcelona, each train consists of five walk-through cars with longitudinal seating throughout: a five-car train has 112 seats and a three-car train has 64 seats. The end cars contain dedicated spaces for wheelchair users and bicycles.

The trains have closed-circuit television and passenger alarms for public safety, visual and audible door indicators, LCD screens for travel information and advertising, and line maps with lights that indicate the next stations. SEC Lighting provided the semi-recessed fluorescent saloon lighting for the trains.

The actual train cars are made of aluminum with mostly plastic and metal interior parts.

Integral Design and Development was in charge of the exterior and interior design of those vehicles back in 2002, in both driving possibilities, driverless and conventional driver's cab.

Variations
In Barcelona, there are two versions of the 9000 series fleet:
34 trains on lines 2/4 have segregated driver cabs and red dot-matrix running numbers, although passengers can still see through the front. They are capable of manual and automatic operation.
22 trains on lines 9/10 are automatic and driverless. However, driver controls are available if necessary, and they have front-end evacuation ramps and a smaller front window.

Operation
The 9000 Series presently operate on lines 2, 4 (the latter running in conjunction with the 2100 series), 9 and 10. In an unlikely event of a shortage of trains, they may operate on any standard gauge sections with an overhead power supply.

Roster
Individual cars of the 9000 Series have a four-digit number beginning with 9: originally, the car numbers ranged from 9001 to 9200 for the motor cars, and R9501 to R9550 for the trailer cars, with 50 trains available in total. Due to the order for 6 additional trains in April 2009, and another two in 2019, the numbering ranges for the 9000 Series is currently as follows:

In further detail:

9000 Series abroad
Four other metro systems operate the 9000 series or its derivatives, with segregated driver cabs and walk-through cars: the Santo Domingo Metro operates 34 three-car trains with a similar external livery, and the Lima Metro has operated 19 five-car trains in its own external and internal livery since February 2013. The Guadalajara light rail system is now operating 18 of them on line 3. All of these trains were also manufactured in Belgium, France and Spain. Very similar rolling stock is used in the Panama Metro. They were all made in Barcelona, Catalonia, Spain.

9000 Series in culture
The Via Oberta miniature railway operates a live steam scale (1:11) version of the 9000 series in the Barcelona Metro livery.

Citations

References

Barcelona Metro
Rapid transit in Peru
Rapid transit in the Dominican Republic
Alstom multiple units
Guadalajara light rail system

ca:Material rodant del metro de Barcelona#Sèrie 9000
1500 V DC multiple units
Rolling stock of Mexico
Rapid transit in Panama